The Yellow House is a 2007 Algerian film.

Synopsis
In Algeria, in the arid mountainous landscapes of the Aurès, a family learns from the police that their eldest son Belkacem has died in an accident, while doing his military service. On hearing the news, Mouloud immediately sets off to the city on his old tractor to retrieve his son's body, wishing to give him a decent burial. Mouloud's journey is plagued by suffering and loneliness. On his return, he realizes that his wife Fatima is grieving deeply. Fearing that she will never feel happy again, Mouloud tries everything to make her smile, refusing to give up because, like all the peasants in the hostile lands of the Aurès, he knows that "To give up is to die a little...".

Awards
 Locarno 2007
 Valencia 2007

External links

 

2007 films
Algerian drama films
Moroccan drama films
Films directed by Amor Hakkar